Caryopteris (bluebeard) is a genus of flowering plants in the family Lamiaceae (formerly often placed in the family Verbenaceae). They are native to east Asia (China, Korea, Japan, Mongolia).

They are herbaceous plants or small shrubs growing to 1–4 m tall. The leaves are opposite, simple ovate to lanceolate, with an entire or crenate margin; they are often aromatic. The blue or white flowers are pollinated by butterflies and bumblebees. The fruit is a four-valved capsule containing four seeds.

Species
Caryopteris forrestii Diels - Guizhou, Sichuan, Tibet, Yunnan
 Caryopteris glutinosa Rehd. - Sichuan
 Caryopteris incana (Thunb. ex Houtt.) Miq. - Taiwan, Korea, Japan, Anhui, Fujian, Guangdong, Guangxi, Hubei, Hunan, Jiangsu, Jiangxi, Zhejiang 
 Caryopteris jinshajiangensis Y.K.Yang & X.D.Cong - Yunnan
 Caryopteris mongholica Bunge - Mongolia, Gansu, Hebei, Nei Mongol, Shaanxi, Shanxi 
 Caryopteris tangutica Maxim. - Gansu, Hebei, Henan, Hubei, Shaanxi, Sichuan
 Caryopteris trichosphaera W.W.Smith - Tibet, Sichuan, Yunnan

formerly included
Caryopteris aureoglandulosa (Vaniot) C. Y. Wu = Schnabelia aureoglandulosa (Vaniot) P.D.Cantino
Caryopteris bicolor (Roxb. ex Hardw.) Mabb. = Pseudocaryopteris bicolor (Roxb. ex Hardw.) P.D.Cantino
Caryopteris divaricata Maxim = Tripora divaricata (Maxim.) P.D.Cantino
Caryopteris nepetifolia (Benth.) Maxim = Schnabelia nepetifolia (Benth.) P.D.Cantino
Caryopteris paniculata C.B.Clarke = Pseudocaryopteris paniculata (C.B.Clarke) P.D.Cantino
Caryopteris siccanea W.W.Sm. = Rubiteucris siccanea (W.W.Sm.) P.D.Cantino
Caryopteris terniflora Maxim. = Schnabelia terniflora (Maxim.) P.D.Cantino

Cultivation and uses
Though several Caryopteris species are grown in botanical gardens, as ornamental plants the species have largely been superseded in gardens by the hybrid Caryopteris × clandonensis (C. incana × C. mongholica). The accidental cross that produced it occurred in the garden of Arthur Simmonds at Clandon, near Guildford, Surrey.<ref>David S. MacKenzie, Perennial Ground Covers, s.v. "Caryopteris × clandonensis 'Arthur Simmonds'".</ref> In 1930, wishing to propagate C. mongholica, he gathered seeds from a plant that was growing near C. mastacanthus. When the seedlings eventually flowered in their second year, hybrids appeared. The final selection, however, was made of a self-sown volunteer that appeared under C. mastacanthus, and eventually smothered it. It began winning Royal Horticultural Society medals in 1933."The genus is usually represented by Caryopteris × clandonensis, which has superseded all the original species". Alice M. Coats, Garden Shrubs and Their Histories (1964) 1992, s.v. "Caryopteris". This small, deciduous, aromatic shrub has grey-green leaves and produces masses of blue flowers in late summer.Caryopteris × clandonensis, an unusual plant in American gardens in the 1960s, has become more familiar there, especially in xeriscaping.

Like Buddleja'', the woody stems can die back in the winter, particularly in colder climates and on heavy soils. They prefer well-drained, sandy soil in full sun, but does not need especially rich soil or constant moisture.

Leaves and herbaceous stems have a terpene aroma like eucalyptus, especially when lightly bruised.

Cultivars
There are several cultivars with flowers in shades of blue or white, including 'Blue Mist', 'Heavenly Blue', 'Longwood Blue', 'Dark Knight', 'Summer Sorbet' and 'Pershore'.

The following cultivars have gained the Royal Horticultural Society's Award of Garden Merit:-

'Arthur Simmonds',
'First Choice'  
 = 'Lisaura' 
 = 'Lissilv'
'Summer Sorbet' 
'Worcester Gold'

References

External links
 
 

Lamiaceae
Lamiaceae genera
Flora of China
Flora of Eastern Asia
Flora of Mongolia
Taxa named by Alexander von Bunge